Michael Stockwin Howard (14 September 1922 – 4 January 2002) was an English choral conductor, organist and composer. He was an important part of the Early Music movement in the middle of the last century, in particular as a celebrated interpreter of 16th century polyphony In his later years he made notable recordings of the late French Romantic school of organ composers, particularly César Franck, on the Cavaillé Coll organ at St. Michael's Abbey in Farnborough.  The National Pipe Organ Register now claims that the organ appears in a list of organs by Mutin (originally attributed to Aristide Cavaille-Coll).

Educated at Ellesmere College, Shropshire, Michael went on to study Organ (with G.D. Cunningham) and Composition (with William Alwyn) at the Royal Academy of Music in London. His organ studies continued with Ralph Downes at the Brompton Oratory, London, and Marcel Dupré at St Sulpice in Paris.

In 1944 he founded The Renaissance Singers with whom he gave numerous concerts and made many recordings and broadcasts for the next twenty years. He was organist of Tewkesbury Abbey (1943–1944), Christ Church, Woburn Square in London (1945–1950), Ely Cathedral (1953–1958), St. Marylebone Parish Church in London (1971–1979) and at St. Michael's Abbey in Farnborough (1984–1986). In the 1960s he formed and conducted the sixteen-voice group Cantores in Ecclesia.

References

External links
Information about the premiere recordings of Michael Howard's Seven Songs for Countertenor
Information about restored and reissued recordings made by Michael Howard conducting The Choir of Ely Cathedral and The Renaissance Singers
Link to a recording made at Farnborough Abbey by Michael Howard
Link to a recording made at Farnborough Abbey by Michael Howard
Link to a recording made at Farnborough Abbey by Michael Howard
Link to a BBC Classics reissue of Music for Westminster Abbey (Purcell) by Michael Howard and Cantores in Ecclesia
Link to reissues by L'Oiseau Lyre of recordings of Byrd made by Michael Howard and Cantores in Ecclesia

Alumni of the Royal Academy of Music
20th-century classical composers
Composers for pipe organ
English classical composers
English classical organists
British male organists
Organ improvisers
Cathedral organists
People from Groombridge
1922 births
2002 deaths
Musicians from London
English male classical composers
20th-century English composers
Organists of Ely Cathedral
20th-century organists
20th-century British male musicians
Male classical organists